Eucereon moeschleri is a moth of the subfamily Arctiinae first described by Rothschild in 1912. It is found on Jamaica.

References

Moths described in 1912
moeschleri